Glycogen storage disease type IX is a hereditary deficiency of glycogen phosphorylase kinase B that affects the liver and skeletal muscle tissue. It is inherited in an X-linked or autosomal recessive manner.

Signs and symptoms 
The signs and symptoms in glycogen storage disease type IX include:
 Enlarged liver
 Slowed growth
 Motor development delay (mild)
 Low blood sugar accompanied by ketosis
 Lack of muscle tone
Most of these signs and symptoms diminish as adulthood sets in.

Genetics 
Glycogen storage disease type IX can be inherited via:
 X-linked recessive inheritance due to mutations at either PHKA1 or the PHKA2 (most common) gene
 Autosomal recessive could be the inheritance pattern for an affected individual when the genes PHKB or PHKG2 have a mutation.

Diagnosis 

The diagnosis of glycogen storage disease IX consists of the following:
 Complete blood count
 Urinalysis
 Histological study of the liver (via biopsy)
 Genetic testing
 Physical exam

Types 
There are two types of this inherited condition, glycogen storage disease IXa1 and glycogen storage disease IXa2 that affect the liver of an individual. Mutations in PHKA2 have been seen in individuals with glycogen storage disease IXa2.

Management 

The management of Glycogen storage disease IX requires treatment of symptoms by frequent intake of complex carbohydrates and protein to combat the low blood sugar. A nutritionist will advise on suitable diets. Liver function is regularly monitored and problems managed as they arise. However, liver problems have only been successfully treated by a transplant. Routine checks of metabolism are needed to ensure blood sugar (glucose) and ketones are managed. Regular moderate exercise is beneficial, although over-vigorous exercise is to be avoided, especially in those with enlarged livers.

See also 
 Glycogen storage disease

References

Further reading

External links

 

Genetic diseases and disorders